Hum Hain Khalnayak is a 1996 Bollywood action drama film directed by R. Thakur, starring Arjun, Yunus Parvez, Shakti Kapoor and Tiku Talsania.

Cast
 Arjun as Film Producer
 Shakti Kapoor as Tikka Sing
 Yunus Parvez
 Tiku Talsania as Subhashbhai
 Kishore Bhanushali
 Shehzad Khan
 Rajni Bala

Soundtrack

References

External links
 

1990s Hindi-language films
1996 films
Films scored by Bappi Lahiri
Indian action films